Jason Boland & The Stragglers is an American Red Dirt/Texas Country band featuring Harrah, Oklahoma, native Jason Boland (lead vocalist and guitar), Jake Lynn (drums and BGVs), Grant Tracy (bass), Nick Gedra (fiddle and mandolin), AJ Slaughter (pedal steel and lead guitar) and Andrew Bair (keys and BGVs).

Career

Jason Boland and Brad Rice are both members of the Lambda Chi Alpha fraternity, having met in Stillwater, Oklahoma, while attending Oklahoma State University.  Grant Tracy has a degree in Respiratory Therapy from Arkansas Valley Tech Institute.  Boland formed a band in 1998, releasing their first album, Pearl Snaps, in 1999.  Boland and The Stragglers became one of the most successful artists in the Red Dirt/Texas Country scene.  Studio albums Truckstop Diaries and Somewhere in the Middle followed in 2001 and 2004, respectively; a concert at Fort Worth, Texas, dancehall Billy Bob's Texas was recorded for Live and Lit at Billy Bob's Texas in 2002.

The Bourbon Legend was released on Bruce Robison's Sustain Records label in late 2006.  It was produced by longtime Dwight Yoakam collaborator Pete Anderson.

In 2007, Jason Boland co-produced the album Choices for the band Hazzard. The band's front man, Dana Hazzard, was the original fiddle player for the Stragglers.

In 2008, just before the release of the album Comal County Blue, Boland ruptured a vocal cord.  The injury almost caused him to permanently lose his singing voice, but after surgery and resting his voice, he recovered.

According to Katie Key, editor of the Texas Music Chart, "Comal County Blue" was the fastest-growing single in 2008 from an independent label.  
On April 20, 2010, the band released their second live album, entitled High in the Rockies: A Live Album. The recordings come from four live concerts over four days from January 7, 2010 to January 10, 2010. The shows were performed in Steamboat Springs, Colorado, Ft. Collins, Colorado, Laramie, Wyoming, and Denver, Colorado, respectively.

The band released Dark & Dirty Mile on May 14, 2013. Shooter Jennings (son of country music artist Waylon Jennings) co-produced the album with the band.  The title track was a top-five single on the Texas Music chart in May 2013.

Longtime guitarist Roger Ray announced in December, 2014 that he would be leaving The Stragglers for family and personal reasons.  He has been succeeded by Cody Angel.  Their album Squelch, released in 2015, had its best debut on the Top Country Albums chart, where it reached No. 11, selling 4,200 for the week.

The band is currently based in Austin, Texas.

The band released the concept album The Light Saw Me on December 3, 2021, produced by Shooter Jennings. The Light Saw Me follows the story of a Texas cowboy who is abducted by aliens in the 1890s and is dropped back off in Texas in the 1990s. Through this unconventional setting, Boland explores philosophical and religious themes.

Discography

Studio albums

Live albums

Music videos

References

External links
 Band website

American country rock groups
Musical groups established in 1998
Musical groups from Oklahoma